Queens of Langkasuka is a 2008 Thai historical fantasy adventure film directed by Nonzee Nimibutr, and written by two-time S.E.A. Write Award winner Win Lyovarin.

Known as "Pirates Of Langkasuka" in the UK, as "Legend of Langkasuka" in Australia and Canada, and as "Legend of the Tsunami Warrior" in the US.

Plot
Queen Hijau (The Green Queen) of Pattani faces overthrow by the rebel Prince Rawai, who is allied with pirate captain Black Raven. The pirates attempt to capture a huge cannon built by Dutchman Janis Bree and Chinese inventor Lim Kiam, but the Dutch ship carrying the cannon blows up and the cannons sink into the sea.

Meanwhile, an orphaned sea gypsy boy named Pari (meaning "stingray") lies in a fishing village which is constantly under attack by Black Raven's raiding parties. The boy, gifted in the magical art of Dulum, is taken by his uncle Anyar to learn the magical ways of the ocean from White Ray. However, the sage refuses to teach the boy. Nevertheless, Pari is soon able to communicate with the marine life. He grows into manhood and fights against Black Raven's pirates.

Black Raven, who also a practitioner in the Dulum ocean magical arts, has been trying unsuccessfully to raise the huge cannon from the sea.

The local ruler, Queen Hijau, wants her own large cannon and seeks out Lim Kiam, whom she finds is living in the sea gypsy village. She sends away her sisters, Princess Biru (The Blue Princess) and Princess Ungu (The Purple Princess). They are under the protection of the queen's loyal commander, the fierce silat exponent Lord Yarang.

Yarang comes under attack at the village by Black Raven's. Pari helps fight off the pirates, and Yarang escapes. Princess Ungu was thought to have been killed, but she was rescued by Pari and taken to White Ray's remote island.

A romance develops between Ungu and Pari, but Ungu is intended to marry the Prince of Pahang, an important ally of Langkasuka. Pari himself is still tortured by memories of the death of his childhood sweetheart at the hands of Black Raven's men.

Pari encounters Black Ray, an evil, unstable alter ego of White Ray, and begins to learn more about Dulum and the conflict between the black and white sides of the magic.

Eventually, all the forces - the rebel prince, the pirates, the ocean sorcerers, the queen and the princesses - battle for the sunken cannon. During this battle, Black Raven uses a pair of whales to tow a raft with a heavy cannon into range of the castle walls.  Pari - previously presumed to be dead - responds by rising from the ocean, standing on the back of a manta ray.  He calls to the whales who slip their bonds and breach, landing on and destroying Black Raven's raft

Cast
Jarunee Suksawat as Queen Hijau
 Jacqueline Apithananon as Princess Biru
Anna Ris as Princess Ungu
Chupong Changprung as Lord Yarang
Ananda Everingham as Pari
Sorapong Chatree as White Ray/Black Ray
Jesdaporn Pholdee as Abdul Ghafur Muhiuddin Shah of Pahang
Winai Kraibutr as Black Raven
Jakkrit Phanichphatikram as Lim Kium
Andre Machielsen as Janis Bree
Preecha Katkham as Anyar
Kunanek Naiyanaprasert as Pari (youth)
Suwinit Panjamawat as Yarang's second in command
Manassanan Patcharasopachai
Mesini Keawratri
Ake Oree as Prince Rawai
Thiti Micheli
Attaporn Theemakorn
Suppakorn Kitsuwan
Arisa Sontirod
Kamol Luangrojkul

Reception
Queens of Langkasuka, which went into production in 2005, was at first called Queens of Pattani, but the name was changed to avoid political connections to the South Thailand insurgency and Pattani separatism, and to tie the story in with the legend of Langkasuka.

The film premiered at the 2008 Cannes Film Market to mixed reviews. Derek Elley of Variety said the film lacked focus and at 133 minutes was too long. Maggie Lee of The Hollywood Reporter was more upbeat, praising the sumptuous costume design and action sequences, but also said the film was too long.

Based on the reception from the industry press, studio Sahamongkol Film International pushed for a shorter version of the film. The film's August 2008 release in Thai cinemas was postponed until October, with the director citing Thailand's unstable political atmosphere.

A boost of confidence was given though, when the film was scheduled for the Venice Film Festival, where it would play in a special out-of-competition midnight screening. Queens of Langkasuka was also the "gala opening" film for the 2008 Bangkok International Film Festival.

Derivative works
The screenplay for Queens of Langkasuka was adapted by Win Lyovarin into the novel Bunga Pari, also released in 2008.

References

External links 
 
 
 

2008 films
Thai fantasy films
Thai-language films
Pirate films
Fantasy adventure films
Sahamongkol Film International films